Allipuram (Telugu: అల్లిపురం) is one of the oldest suburbs in Visakhapatnam, Andhra Pradesh, India, close to Visakhapatnam Railway Station. It is near shore to Bay of Bengal. In 1753, Nizam Fauzdar Zafar Ali Khan ruled Visakhapatnam as the center of Chicaco. Allipuram was once a prosperous village, which was frequented by traders who picked up the produce of smiths and weavers. More importantly, the village was once known as Alivelu Manga Puram. Over time it became Allipuram in popular usage. As part of the Salt Satyagraha, Mahatma Gandhi walked along the Allipuram main road to the coast. Because of this, the locals set up a statue of Gandhi on the main road.

Neighborhood areas
Railway Quarters, Daba Gardens, Dondaparthy, Jagadamba Centre, Railway New Colony  are the nearby Localities to Allipuram. Also, Vizag 2 town police station is located here.

Temples
One of the famous temples of Vizag Sri Balligiri Venkateswara Swamy Temple is located here.

Transport
Allipuram is well connected to Visakhapatnam APSRTC bus station. The nearest Railway Station is Visakhapatnam Railway Station .

APSRTC routes

References

Neighbourhoods in Visakhapatnam

https://timesofindia.indiatimes.com/city/visakhapatnam/allipuram-temple-caught-in-time-wrap/articleshow/50330156.cms